Bucket of Blood may refer to:

A Bucket of Blood, a 1959 film
A Bucket of Blood (1995 film), a 1995 remake of the 1959 film
Bucket of Blood (musical), an American musical
The Bucket of Blood, a public house in Cornwall, UK
Bucket of Blood Street, Holbrook, Arizona, USA
Bucket of Blood Saloon, old West saloon in Arizona
Bloody Mary (cocktail), originally called "Bucket of Blood"

See also

 The Bloody Bucket (pub), DeSoto Caverns, Alabama, USA; a prohibition-era speakeasy
 28th Infantry Division (United States), nicknamed "The Bloody Bucket"
 Blood Bucket (album), a 2004 album by New Zealand band Human (band)